This is a list of the National Register of Historic Places listings in Blanco County, Texas.

This is intended to be a complete list of properties and districts listed on the National Register of Historic Places in Blanco County, Texas. There are two district and two individual properties listed on the National Register in the county. One district includes an individual property and a State Antiquities Landmark both of which are Recorded Texas Historic Landmarks. The other district is a National Historic Park and includes another Recorded Texas Historic Landmark.

Current listings

The locations of National Register properties and districts may be seen in a mapping service provided.

|}

See also

National Register of Historic Places listings in Texas
Recorded Texas Historic Landmarks in Blanco County

References

External links

Blanco County, Texas
Blanco County
Buildings and structures in Blanco County, Texas